Supernaut is the debut studio album by Australian glam rock band Supernaut. The album was released in November 1976 and peaked at number 13 on the Australian Kent Music Report.

The album sold 8,000 copied on the day of release and sold over 50,000 by the end of 1976 and was certified gold in Australia.

Track listing
LP/Cassette (2907 029)

Chart

References

1976 debut albums